Vishnudeo Sai (born 21 February 1964) is an Indian politician, served as State President of Bharatiya Janata Party for Chhattisgarh from 2020 until 2022. He was Union Minister of State for Steel in First Modi ministry. He was a member of the 16th Lok Sabha representing the Raigarh constituency of Chhattisgarh.

Early life 

On 21 February 1964, Vishnu Deo Sai was born to a farmer's family in Bagia village of Jashpur district in the state of Chhattisgarh.  He did his higher secondary schooling in Loyola Higher Secondary School at Kunkuri, Jashpur.

Personal life 

Vishnu Deo Sai was born to Shri Ram Prasad Sai and Smt. Jashmani Devi on 21 February 1964. He married Smt. Kaushalya Devi in 1991.

Political life 

Vishnu Deo Sai's political career started when he was elected unopposed Sarpanch in village Bagia.
 1990-98 		: Member, Madhya Pradesh Legislative Assembly (two terms) 
 1999 			: Elected to 13th Lok Sabha 
 1999-2000 		: Member, Committee on Absence of Members from the sittings of the House and Member, Committee on Food, Civil Supplies and Public Distribution
 2000-2004		: Member, Consultative Committee, Ministry of Agriculture
 2004	 		: Re-elected to 14th Lok Sabha (2nd term), Member, Committee on Information Technology
 5 August 2007		: Member, Committee on Water Resources
 2009	 		: Re-elected to 15th Lok Sabha (3rd term)
 31 August 2009	: Member, Committee on Commerce
 2014 	: Re-elected to 16th Lok Sabha (4th term)
 9 November 2014:  Union Minister of State for Mines, Steel
 5 July 2016           : Union Minister of State, Ministry of Steel

Social and cultural activities 

His interest is in serving people belonging to scheduled castes and scheduled tribes, and taking interest in the treatment of sick people.

Special interests 

Reading books, upliftment of tribal people by working for their development and serving the poor.

Sports and clubs 
Badminton and Football

References

External links
 Home Page on the Parliament of India's Website

1964 births
Living people
India MPs 1999–2004
India MPs 2004–2009
India MPs 2009–2014
Lok Sabha members from Chhattisgarh
India MPs 2014–2019
People from Raigarh district
Bharatiya Janata Party politicians from Chhattisgarh
Narendra Modi ministry